Benya Krik is a 1927 Soviet silent film directed by  and starring  as Benya Krik.

Benya Krik is a fictional character in Isaac Babel's cycle of short stories, Odessa Stories. He is a Jewish Russian gangster, and he and his gang of thugs are the main focus of the stories.

The film was based on a screenplay written by Babel  in 1926, in which he adapted parts of his short stories "The King" and "How It Was Done in Odessa", in addition to creating new content.

The film was restored and supplied with English subtitles by the National Center for Jewish Film.

Cast 
 Matvey Lyarov as Mendel Krik
 Yuri Shumsky as Benya Krik - Mendel's son
 Nikolai Nademsky as Kolka Pakovski
 Ivan Zamychkovsky as Gleczik - the policeman
 Sergei Minin as Sobkov - the commissar
 A. Goricheva
 A. Vabnik
 Teodor Brainin
 Georgi Astafyev	
 A. Sashin as Savka

References

External links
 Benya Krik at the Internet Movie Database.

Soviet black comedy films
1920s black comedy films
Russian black comedy films
Soviet silent feature films
Soviet black-and-white films
Odesa in fiction
1926 comedy films
1926 films
Russian black-and-white films
Russian silent feature films
1920s Russian-language films
Silent comedy films